The McNeese Cowgirls softball team represents McNeese State University, located in Lake Charles, Louisiana. The Cowgirls are a member of the Southland Conference and participate in NCAA Division I college softball. The team is currently led by head coach James Landreneau and plays home games at Joe Miller Field at Cowgirl Diamond.

History
The first season for McNeese State Cowgirl softball was 1979. The Cowgirls competed as an independent for the first four seasons. The team won the Louisiana championship two of those seasons (1979, 1981).  After softball became an NCAA and  Southland Conference sponsored sport, the Cowgirls have competed in the conference and at the Division I (NCAA) level. The Cowgirls have won six Southland Conference regular season championships (1983, 1994 (T), 2013, 2014, 2016, 2017) and seven Southland Conference tournament championships (1983, 2005, 2014, 2016, 2017, 2018, 2021) earning the conference's autobid to the NCAA Division I softball tournament in 2005 2014, 2016, 2017, 2018, and 2021. The team also competed in the 1994 NCAA tournament as an at-large selection. As of the conclusion of the 2018 season, the Cowgirls have compiled a 1041–1048–4 overall record with an overall conference record of 406–346–3. Erika Piancastelli is McNeese State's first and only All-American. She was named an NFCA All-American in 2016.

Career coaching records

(Records reflect game results through 2021 season.)

Year-by-year results
Source:

Post-season appearances

Conference Tournaments
Sources:

NCAA Division I tournament results
The Cowgirls have appeared in six NCAA Division I tournaments. Their record is 5–14.Source:

NISC Tournament results
The Cowgirls have appeared in one NISC tournament. Their record is 3–2.

Awards and honors

Sources:

Southland Conference

Coach of the Year 
 Scott Eastman 1994
 Natalie Poole 2009
 Mike Smith 2013, 14
 James Landreneau 2017

All Conference First Team 
 Tammy Guidry 1983
 Joni Talbot 1987
 Angela Harrison 1994
 Keri Riggs 1994, 95
 Shyla Sicks 1994
 Kerri Chiasson  1995
 Natalie Poole 1995, 96, 97
 Kathy Sturgeon 1995
 Sarah Everingham 1997, 98
 Heather Moreaux 2000
 Tania Zanet 2000
 Beth Jordan 2002, 05
 Stephanie Denham 2003
 Brooke Broadhead 2007
 Jenny Clay 2008
 Claire Terracina 2011, 12
 Ashley Modzelewski 2012, 13, 14
 Meagan Bond 2013
 Alanna DiVittorio 2013, 14
 Jamie Allred 2014
 Erika Piancastelli 2015, 16, 17, 18
 Bryanna Castro 2015
 Lauren Langner 2015
 Hailey Drew 2016
 Morgan Catron 2016, 18
 Emily Vincent 2016
 Alexandria Saldivar 2017, 18
 Justyce McClain 2017, 18, 19
 Rachel Smith 2017

Hitter of the Year 
 Kerry Riggs 1994
 Heather Moreaux 2000
 Alanna DiVittorio 2014
 Erika Piancastelli 2015, 16, 17, 18

Newcomer of the Year 
 Rikki Fontenot 2002
 Christina Allen 2006
 Erika Piancastelli 2015

Pitcher of the Year 
 Angella Harrison 1994
 Jamie Allred 2014
 Rachel Smith 2017

Utility Player of the Year 
Jenny Clay 2007, 08

Player of the Year 
 Heather Moreaux 2000
 Alanna DiVittorio 2014
 Erika Piancastelli 2015, 16, 17, 18

See also
List of NCAA Division I softball programs

References

External links
Official website

 
1979 establishments in Louisiana
Sports clubs established in 1979
McNeese State Cowgirls